Jean Duvernoy (1 January 1917 – 19 August 2010, Saint-Jean de Luz) was a French medievalist. Born in 1917 in Bourgoin to a Protestant family, he began to study the Waldensians and later Catharism. He edited and translated a great number of sources, including Jacques Fournier's inquisition register, from which the French historian Emmanuel Le Roy Ladurie extracted Montaillou: The Promised Land of Error.

Works 
 Le Registre d'inquisition de Jacques Fournier, évêque de Pamiers, 1318-1325 : manuscrit Vat. latin n°4030 de la Bibliothèque vaticane, publié avec introduction et notes par Jean Duvernoy (3 volumes, 1965). Réédition : Tchou, Paris, 2004.
 Inquisition à Pamiers, interrogatoires de Jacques Fournier : 1318-1325, chosen, translated from Latin and présented by Jean Duvernoy, 1966
 Chronique, [1203-1275], by Guillaume de Puylaurens, text edited, translated and annotated by Jean Duvernoy,  1976
 La religion des cathares, 1976
 L'histoire des cathares, 1979
 Inquisition à Pamiers : cathares, juifs, lépreux, devant leurs juges, 1986
 Spirituels et béguins du Midi, by Raoul Manselli, translation Jean Duvernoy, 1989
 Cathares, vaudois et béguins : dissidents du pays d'Oc, 1994
 Chronique, 1229-1244 par Guillaume Pelhisson, text edited, translated and annotated by Jean Duvernoy, 1994
 Le Dossier de Montségur, interrogatoires d'inquisition, 1242-1247 translated, annotated and presentated by Jean Duvernoy, 1998
 Les cathares, Jean Duvernoy, 1998
 Le procès de Bernard Délicieux, 1319, translated, annotated and presentated by  Jean Duvernoy, 2001
 L'Inquisition en Quercy : le registre des pénitences de Pierre Cellan, 1241-1242, prefaced, translated from Latin and annotated by Jean Duvernoy, 2001

Writers from Montbéliard
Historians of Catharism
1917 births
2010 deaths
20th-century French writers
French medievalists
Latin–French translators
20th-century French translators
20th-century French male writers
French male non-fiction writers